The 2012–13 season was Swansea City's fourth season in the top tier of English football, and their second consecutive season in the Premier League. It was their 93rd season in the English football league system.

The club celebrated its centenary, and to mark the occasion released a new crest. In keeping with the centenary theme, the home kit for the season used the colours white and gold, rather than the more traditional white and black, making it very similar to the 2011–12 Real Madrid home kit (also manufactured by Adidas). The away kit for the season was red, white and green, depicting the colours of the Welsh flag.

During pre-season, Brendan Rodgers became the new Liverpool manager and signed a three-year contract on 1 June. In total, Liverpool paid Swansea £7 million in compensation for Rodgers, coach Colin Pascoe, assistant performance analyst Chris Davies and performance consultant Glen Driscoll. On 15 June, Swansea appointed former Barcelona, Real Madrid and Juventus midfielder Michael Laudrup as their new manager. Laudrup signed a two-year contract with the club.

Pre-season friendlies
Swansea began their 2012–13 campaign with a 10-day pre-season tour of America. The club played against MLS sides Colorado Rapids and San Jose Earthquakes, and also against USL Premier Development League side Ventura County Fusion. The Club also played at other venues within the UK, including a trip to Aberystwyth. This Swansea team contained some first team players, but also some reserves and youngsters, although it was part of the first team calendar. They also played Carmarthen Town. Swansea's first opponents at the Liberty Stadium were Blackpool.

Competitions

Overall

Premier League

League table

Results summary

Results by round

Matches

FA Cup

League Cup

Squad statistics

First team squads 

Last updated on 19 May 2013

Goals and appearances

|-
|colspan="14"|Players featured for Swansea but left before the end of the season:

|}

Top scorers
Includes all competitive matches. The list is sorted by shirt number when total goals are equal.

As of 12 May 2013

^^ Player left the club during the Season

Disciplinary record
Includes all competitive matches. The list is sorted by shirt number when total cards are equal.

As of 20 April 2013

Captains
Accounts for the Premier League only.

Transfers and loans

Transfers in

Transfers out

Loans in

Loans out

New contracts

Club staff

Backroom staff

Board of directors

Notes

References

2012-13
2012–13 Premier League by team
Welsh football clubs 2012–13 season